A list of people, who died during the 17th century, who have received recognition as Blessed (through beatification) or Saint (through canonization) from the Catholic Church:

See also 

Christianity in the 17th century

17
 Christian saints
17th-century venerated Christians
Lists of 17th-century people